Lance Guidry (born March 25, 1971) is an American football coach and former player, who currently serves as the defensive coordinator for the Miami Hurricanes program. Guidry served as the head football coach at McNeese State University from 2016 to 2018. He was also the interim head football coach at Miami University for one game in 2010 and at Western Kentucky University for one game in 2012.  Guidry played college football as a defensive back at McNeese State from 1990 to 1993. He was a four-year starter, a Team Captain and was also a two-time All-Southland Conference selection. Guidry ranks 17th on the McNeese all-time tackle leader board and also ranks 10th in interceptions.

Coaching career

Miami (OH)
Guidry served as defensive backs coach for Miami during its 2010 MAC Championship season. That same season Miami orchestrated the second largest turnaround in the history of college football going 10-4 after winning just one game (1-11) the year before. At the end of the season, head coach Mike Haywood left the team prior to the 2011 Go-Daddy.com Bowl. Guidry served as Interim Head Coach for the bowl game leading the Redhawks to a 35–21 victory over Middle Tennessee.

Western Kentucky
After the Go-Daddy.com Bowl victory, Guidry became defensive coordinator for Western Kentucky University.
By his second season (2012), Guidry's defense was #1 in the Sun Belt Conference and 26th nationally. That year Western Kentucky earned its first-ever bowl invite (Little Caesar's Bowl) since its transition to the FBS Level. Head Coach Willie Taggart left prior to the Little Caesar's Bowl, and once again Guidry was tabbed as the Interim Head Coach for the bowl game, where the Hilltoppers lost a tight game to Central Michigan in the waning minutes of the 4th quarter (24–21).

McNeese State
In 2013, Guidry returned to his alma mater to become the defensive coordinator for the Cowboys. Guidry's presence was immediately felt as McNeese won 10 games for the first time six years and made the FCS playoffs for the first time in four years. In his third season, Guidry's defense ranked 12th nationally in total defense, 3rd in scoring defense and 4th in rushing defense - leading the way for McNeese's perfect regular season (10–0) and 2015 Southland Conference Championship.

After the 2015 season, head coach Matt Viator left McNeese to become head coach at Louisiana-Monroe and Guidry was named as the 15th head coach in McNeese State history. After three winning seasons, on November 20, 2018, it was announced that Guidry's contract would not be renewed.

After McNeese
Guidry spent the 2019 season as the defensive coordinator at Southeastern Louisiana. The following season, Guidry re-united with Willie Taggart as the safeties coach on Taggart's Florida Atlantic staff.

Marshall
In January 2021, it was announced that Guidry would be joining Charles Huff's inaugural staff at Marshall University as the Thundering Herd's defensive coordinator.

Guidry's 2022 Marshall Defense finished the season ranked in the Top 10 nationally in 12 different defensive categories, helping guide the Herd to an 8-4 regular season record.

Marshall 2022 Defense National Ranks: 
1st - 3rd down Defense;  
2nd - Def Stop rate;  
4th - Efficiency Defense;  
5th - Turnovers gained;  
6th - Pass Eff Defense;  
6th - Rushing Defense;  
7th - Scoring Def;  
7th - Yards per play;  
9th - Sacks;  
9th - Interceptions;  
10th - 1st down Defense;  
10th - Total Defense.

Tulane

On January 20, 2023, it was announced that Guidry was hired as the defensive coordinator for the 2023 Tulane Green Wave football team, replacing the outgoing Chris Hampton.

Miami
However, on February 7, 2023, the Associated Press stated sources were reporting that the University of Miami would be hiring him for the same position.

Head coaching record

College

Notes

References

External links
 
 Marshall profile
 McNeese State profile

1971 births
Living people
American football defensive backs
Florida Atlantic Owls football coaches
Marshall Thundering Herd football coaches
Miami RedHawks football coaches
McNeese Cowboys football coaches
McNeese Cowboys football players
Southeastern Louisiana Lions football coaches
Tulane Green Wave football coaches
Western Kentucky Hilltoppers football coaches
High school football coaches in Louisiana
People from Welsh, Louisiana
Coaches of American football from Louisiana
Players of American football from Louisiana